The Asian and Oceanian Zone is one of the three zones of regional Davis Cup competition in 2009.

In the Asian and Oceanian Zone there are four different groups in which teams compete against each other to advance to the next group.

Participating teams

Draw

 relegated to Group II in 2010.
 and  advance to World Group play-off.
 defeated  4–1 in a 1st round tie on 6–8 February in Hsinchuang, Chinese Taipei.

First Round Matches

Kazakhstan vs. Chinese Taipei

Second Round Matches

Australia vs. Thailand

India vs. Chinese Taipei

China vs. Japan

Uzbekistan vs. South Korea

Third Round Matches

Australia vs. India

Australia refused to play the tie due to security concerns in Chennai, so India advance to the World Group Playoffs via forfeit.

Japan vs. Uzbekistan

First-round play-offs

Thailand vs. Kazakhstan

China vs. South Korea

Second-round play-offs

Thailand vs. China

External links
Davis Cup draw details

Group I
Davis Cup Asia/Oceania Zone